Conners is a surname. Notable people include:

 Bob Conners (1933-2014), American radio personality
 Corey Conners (born 1992), Canadian golfer
 Dan Conners (born 1941), former American football player
 Gene Conners (1930-2010), American trombonist and singer
 Jack Conners (born 1943), American politician 
 Joseph Conners (born 1987), English wrestler
 Keith Conners (1933-2017), American psychologist
 Paige Conners (born 2000), Israeli-American pairs figure skater

See also
Connors (surname)
Conner (surname)
The Conners